Too Tough is the fourth studio album by the recording artist Angela Bofill, released on January 2, 1983. This was her second release through Arista Records, with Narada Michael Walden again serving as joint music producer.

Reception

Too Tough performed better on the charts than her previous album, Something About You. The title track, "Too Tough", laced with double entendre, became a sizable dancefloor hit, spending four weeks at number two on the Billboard Dance chart. It also peaked at number five on the Billboard soul chart. The remainder of the album has similar dance-pop songs and a few soulful ballads.

Track listing
"Too Tough" (Jeffrey Cohen, Narada Michael Walden) 5:36
"Ain't Nothing Like the Real Thing" (feat. Boz Scaggs) (Nikolas Ashford, Valerie Simpson) 3:04
"Tonight I Give In" (Lana Bogan, Donnie Shelton) 3:21
"You Could Come Take Me Home" (Cohen, Walden) 3:51
"Love You Too Much" (Gerard McMahon) 3:56
"Is This a Dream" (Angela Bofill, Danny Madden, Eva Lee, Steve Gaboury) 5:11
"Song for a Rainy Day" (Bofill) 3:37
"I Can See It in Your Eyes" (Bofill, Madden, Lee, Gaboury) 3:31
"Accept Me (I'm Not a Girl Anymore)" (Bofill) 3:34
"Rainbow Inside My Heart" (Bofill) 3:44

Personnel
Angela Bofill - lead and backing vocals
Narada Michael Walden - drums, keyboards, percussion
Sheila Escovedo - percussion
Nat Adderley, Jr., Steve Robbins, Frank Martin - keyboards
Buddy Williams, Steve Ferrone - drums
Randy Jackson, Francisco Centeno - bass guitar
Corrado Rustici, Doc Powell, Peter Manu  - guitar
Fred Berry, Tim Acosta, Wayne Wallace - horns
Marc Russo - saxophone
Brian Atkinson - vibraphone
Boz Scaggs - co-lead vocals (track 2)
Jim Gilstrap, John Lehman, Kelly Kool, Myrna Matthews - backing vocals

Charts

Weekly charts

Year-end charts

Singles

References

External links
 Angela Bofill - Too Tough at Discogs

1983 albums
Angela Bofill albums
Albums produced by Narada Michael Walden
Arista Records albums
Dance-pop albums by American artists